This is a list of Canadian films which were released in 2014:

See also
 2014 in Canada
 2014 in Canadian television

References

External links
Feature Films Released In 2014 With Country of Origin Canada at IMDb
2015 Canadian Screen Awards (nominees and winners)
Canada's Top Ten for 2014 (lists of top ten features, shorts, and student shorts, selected in a process administered by TIFF)

2014

Canada